Claypool is a surname. Notable people with the surname include:

Chase Claypool (born 1998), Canadian-born American football player
Forrest Claypool, politician
Horatio C. Claypool, U. S. Congressman
Harold K. Claypool, U. S. Congressman
Les Claypool, bassist, singer
Philip Claypool, American country music artist
Ralph Claypool, American football player
William Claypool, American racehorse trainer